Prosternon is a genus of click beetles belonging to the family Elateridae.

Species
Species within this genus include:
 Prosternon admirabile Gurjeva, 1984
 Prosternon aurichalceum Stepanov, 1930
 Prosternon bombycinus (Germar, 1843)
 Prosternon chrysocomum (Germar, 1843)
 Prosternon egregium Denisova, 1948
 Prosternon fallax (Say, 1834)
 Prosternon hamata (Say, 1834)
 Prosternon hoppingi (Van Dyke, 1932)
 Prosternon medianus (Germar, 1843)
 Prosternon mirabilis (Fall, 1901)
 Prosternon montanum Gurjeva, 1980
 Prosternon semilutea (LeConte, 1853)
 Prosternon sericeum (Gebler, 1824)
 Prosternon syriacum Buysson, 1891
 Prosternon tessellatum (Linnaeus, 1758)
 Prosternon viduus (Brown, 1936)

References

Elateridae
Elateridae genera
Beetles of Europe